The 1995 Cal State Fullerton Titans baseball team represented California State University, Fullerton in the 1995 NCAA Division I baseball season. The Titans played their home games at Titan Field. The team was coached by Augie Garrido in his 20th season at Cal State Fullerton.

The Titans won the College World Series, defeating the USC Trojans in the championship series. Baseball America named them the best college team of the 20th century.

Roster

Schedule 

! style="background:#FF7F00;color:#004A80;"| Regular Season
|- valign="top" 

|- align="center" bgcolor="#ddffdd"
| January 31 ||  || 7-1 || 1-0 || –
|- align="center" bgcolor="#ddffdd"
| February 3 || Stanford || 11-9 || 2-0 || –
|- align="center" bgcolor="#ffdddd"
| February 4 || Stanford || 10-11 || 2-1 || –
|- align="center" bgcolor="#ddffdd"
| February 5 || Stanford || 5-3 || 3-1 || –
|- align="center" bgcolor="#ddffdd"
| February 7 || at  || 6-2 || 4-1 || –
|- align="center" bgcolor="#ddffdd"
| February 9 || at  || 10-2 || 5-1 || –
|- align="center" bgcolor="#ddffdd"
| February 10 || at Arizona || 10-2 || 6-1 || –
|- align="center" bgcolor="#ddffdd"
| February 12 || at Arizona || 6-1 || 7-1 || –
|- align="center" bgcolor="#ddffdd"
| February 15 ||  || 3-2 || 8-1 || –
|- align="center" bgcolor="#ffdddd"
| February 17 || at  || 3-6 || 8-2 || –
|- align="center" bgcolor="#ddffdd"
| February 18 || at Fresno State || 4-3 || 9-2 || –
|- align="center" bgcolor="#ddffdd"
| February 19 || at Fresno State || 7-3 || 10-2 || –
|- align="center" bgcolor="#ddffdd"
| February 21 || Southern California || 10-9 || 11-2 || –
|- align="center" bgcolor="#ddffdd"
| February 24 ||  || 7-3 || 12-2 || –
|- align="center" bgcolor="#ddffdd"
| February 25 ||  || 20-3 || 13-2 || –
|- align="center" bgcolor="#ddffdd"
| February 26 ||  || 14-6 || 14-2 || –
|-

|- align="center" bgcolor="ddffdd"
| March 1 ||  || 5-3 || 15–2 || –
|- align="center" bgcolor="#ffdddd"
| March 3 || at Texas || 1-2 || 15-3 || –
|- align="center" bgcolor="#ddffdd"
| March 4 || at Texas || 17-3 || 16-3 || –
|- align="center" bgcolor="#ddffdd"
| March 5 || at Texas || 6-4 || 17-3 || –
|- align="center" bgcolor="#ddffdd"
| March 8 || at Pepperdine || 6-3 || 18-3 || –
|- align="center" bgcolor="ddffdd"
| March 10 ||  || 8-6 || 19–3 || –
|- align="center" bgcolor="ddffdd"
| March 12 || Gonzaga || 7-2 || 20–3 || –
|- align="center" bgcolor="ddffdd"
| March 15 || at  || 18-1 || 21–3 || –
|- align="center" bgcolor="ddffdd"
| March 18 ||  || 8-3 || 22–3 || –
|- align="center" bgcolor="ddffdd"
| March 19 || Cal Poly || 12-3 || 23–3 || –
|- align="center" bgcolor="ddffdd"
| March 20 || Cal Poly || 15-1 || 24–3 || –
|- align="center" bgcolor="ddffdd"
| March 24 ||  || 11-1 || 25–3 || 1–0
|- align="center" bgcolor="ddffdd"
| March 25 || San Jose State || 17-1 || 26–3 || 2-0
|- align="center" bgcolor="ffdddd"
| March 26 || San Jose State || 3-6 || 26–4 || 2–1
|- align="center" bgcolor="ffdddd"
| March 28 || Southern California || 4-7 || 26–5 || –
|- align="center" bgcolor="ddffdd"
| March 31 || at  || 9-6 || 27–5 || 3–1
|-

|- align="center" bgcolor="ddffdd"
| April 1 || at UC Santa Barbara || 10-8 || 28–5 || 4–1
|- align="center" bgcolor="ddffdd"
| April 2 || at UC Santa Barbara || 7-5 || 29–5 || 5–1
|- align="center" bgcolor="ddffdd"
| April 5 || Loyola Marymount || 14-5 || 30–5 || –
|- align="center" bgcolor="ffdddd"
| April 7 ||  || 1-8 || 30–6 || 5–2
|- align="center" bgcolor="ddffdd"
| April 8 || Long Beach State || 6-5 || 31–6 || 6–2
|- align="center" bgcolor="ddffdd"
| April 9 || Long Beach State || 5-4 || 32–6 || 7–2
|- align="center" bgcolor="ddffdd"
| April 13 || at  || 8-7 || 33–6 || 8–2
|- align="center" bgcolor="ddffdd"
| April 14 || at UNLV || 9-4 || 34–6 || 9–2
|- align="center" bgcolor="ddffdd"
| April 15 || at UNLV || 18-4 || 35–6 || 10–2
|- align="center" bgcolor="ddffdd"
| April 19 || Pepperdine || 6-5 || 36–6 || –
|- align="center" bgcolor="ddffdd"
| April 21 ||  || 2-1 || 37–6 || 11–2
|- align="center" bgcolor="ddffdd"
| April 22 || Pacific || 9-5 || 38–6 || 12–2
|- align="center" bgcolor="ddffdd"
| April 23 || Pacific || 5-0 || 39–6 || 13–2
|- align="center" bgcolor="ffdddd"
| April 25 ||  || 7-8 || 39–7 || –
|- align="center" bgcolor="ffdddd"
| April 26 || Wichita State || 3-4 || 39–8 || –
|- align="center" bgcolor="ffdddd"
| April 28 || at  || 8-10 || 39–9 || 13–3
|- align="center" bgcolor="ddffdd"
| April 29 || at Nevada || 5-4 || 40–9 || 14–3
|- align="center" bgcolor="ddffdd"
| April 30 || at Nevada || 9-5 || 41–9 || 15–3
|-

|- align="center" bgcolor="ddffdd"
| May 3 || at Cal State Northridge || 12-11 || 42–9 || –
|- align="center" bgcolor="ddffdd"
| May 5 ||  || 4-1 || 43–9 || 16–3
|- align="center" bgcolor="ddffdd"
| May 6 || New Mexico State || 25-7 || 44–9 || 17–3
|- align="center" bgcolor="ddffdd"
| May 7 || New Mexico State || 7-0 || 45–9 || 18–3
|- align="center" bgcolor="ddffdd"
| May 9 || San Diego || 5-1 || 46–9 || –
|-

|-
! style="background:#FF7F00;color:#004A80;"| Post-Season
|-

|- align="center" bgcolor="ddffdd"
| May 12 || vs. UNLV || Blair Field || 12-1 || 47–9 
|- align="center" bgcolor="ddffdd"
| May 13 || vs. Nevada || Blair Field || 6-4 || 48–9 
|- align="center" bgcolor="ddffdd"
| May 14 || vs. Long Beach State || Blair Field || 8-4 || 49–9 
|-

|- align="center" bgcolor="ddffdd"
| May 25 || vs.  || Alex Box Stadium || 7–6 || Silva (W; 15-1) || 2,457 || 50–9
|- align="center" bgcolor="ddffdd"
| May 26 || vs.  || Alex Box Stadium || 9–1 || Ward (W; 9-3) || 1,814 || 51–9
|- align="center" bgcolor="ddffdd"
| May 27 || vs.  || Alex Box Stadium || 9–1 || Silva (W; 16-1) || 1,414 || 52–9
|- align="center" bgcolor="ddffdd"
| May 28 || vs. Rice || Alex Box Stadium || 8–7 || Chavez (W; 4-2) || 1,240 || 53–9
|-

|- align="center" bgcolor="ddffdd"
| June 3 || vs. Stanford || Rosenblatt Stadium || 6–5 || Silva (W; 17-1) || 15,643 || 54–9
|- align="center" bgcolor="ddffdd"
| June 5 || vs.  || Rosenblatt Stadium || 11–1 || Ward (W; 10-3) || 8,000 || 55–9
|- align="center" bgcolor="ddffdd"
| June 8 || vs. Tennessee || Rosenblatt Stadium || 11–0 || Dixon (W; 13-0) || 14,242 || 56–9
|- align="center" bgcolor="ddffdd"
| June 8 || vs. Southern California || Rosenblatt Stadium || 11–5 || Silva (W; 18-1) || 22,027 || 57–9
|-

Awards and honors 
C.J. Ankrum
 All-America Freshman

Mark Kotsay
 Golden Spikes Award
 Rotary Smith Award
 Collegiate Baseball Player of the Year
 College World Series Most Outstanding Player
 All-America First Team
 Big West Player of the Year
 All-Big West First Team

Jack Jones
 MVP, NCAA South Regionals Tournament

Brian Loyd
 All-America Third Team
 College World Series All-Tournament Team
 All-Big West First Team

Tony Martinez
 College World Series All-Tournament Team

Tony Miranda
 All-Big West First Team

Ted Silva
 All-America First Team
 College World Series All-Tournament Team
 Big West Pitcher of the Year
 All-Big West First Team

Titans in the 1995 MLB Draft 
The following members of the Cal State Fullerton Titans baseball program were drafted in the 1995 Major League Baseball Draft.

References 

Cal State Fullerton
Cal State Fullerton Titans baseball seasons
College World Series seasons
NCAA Division I Baseball Championship seasons
Big West Conference baseball champion seasons
Fullerton Titans
Cal State Fullerton